A Woman for 24 Hours (German:Die Frau für 24 Stunden) is a 1925 German silent drama film directed by Reinhold Schünzel and starring Lotte Neumann, Harry Liedtke and Kurt Vespermann.

The film's art direction was by Kurt Richter.

Cast
 Lotte Neumann as Olga  
 Harry Liedtke as Graf Cola  
 Kurt Vespermann as Emil Springer  
 Hugo Werner-Kahle as von Daum  
 Max Kronert as Botschafter  
 Maria Kamradek as Käte Kurz  
 Hadrian Maria Netto as Baron Korff  
 Sig Arno as Gebrüder Schick  
 Bruno Arno as Gebrüder Schick

References

Bibliography
 Grange, William. Cultural Chronicle of the Weimar Republic. Scarecrow Press, 2008.

External links

1925 films
Films of the Weimar Republic
Films directed by Reinhold Schünzel
German silent feature films
1925 drama films
German drama films
German black-and-white films
Bavaria Film films
Silent drama films
1920s German films
1920s German-language films